Lee Se-rang (Hangul: 이세랑; born 12 March 1991) is a South Korean badminton player who also plays for the KT&G badminton club. In 2011, she won the Vietnam International tournament in the women's doubles event partnered with Choi Hye-in. In 2012, she became the women's doubles runner-up at the Indonesia International tournament with Yoo Hyun-young.

Achievements

Asian Junior Championships 
Girls' doubles

Mixed doubles

BWF International Challenge/Series 
Women's doubles

  BWF International Challenge tournament
  BWF International Series tournament

References

External links 
 

1991 births
Living people
South Korean female badminton players